Sigalit "Siggy" Flicker (née Paldiel; born June 1, 1967) is an Israeli American relationship specialist, matchmaker, television personality and author of Write Your Own Fairy Tale: The New Rules for Dating, Relationships, and Finding Love on Your Terms. She starred in the VH1 reality-television series Why Am I Still Single?! and was a cast member on the seventh and eighth seasons of Bravo's reality-TV show The Real Housewives of New Jersey.

Background
Flicker was born in Israel to Jewish parents and grew up in Cherry Hill, New Jersey, after moving to the United States as a five-year-old. She is of European and Iraqi descent. Her mother named her Sigalit after the Hebrew word for "violet." After graduating from Cherry Hill High School West, she attended Monmouth University. She supported herself as a waitress at a TGI Friday's and earned a Bachelor of Arts degree in communications.

Career
As of 2011, Flicker had been a matchmaker for more than 20 years and has appeared on national TV programs offering relationship advice. After she and her husband of 10 years divorced amicably, she acted as his matchmaker. Later, when she remarried, her ex-husband served as the best man at her second wedding.

Flicker's relationship-advice book Write Your Own Fairy Tale was published by New American Library in September 2015. That same year, she joined the cast of the seventh and eighth seasons of The Real Housewives of New Jersey. On December 22, 2017, Flicker announced she was departing the show.

Flicker also co-hosted a weekly podcast, Just Sayin''', with Clare Galterio and Sammi Giancola.

Media
Flicker has appeared as a guest on television programs, including The Wendy Williams Show, Good Morning America, Dr. Phil, and others. Her advice column, "Single with Siggy," debuted in the September 2013 issue of Marie Claire. She is known for her loud approach.<ref name="Stasi">Linda Stasi, “’Single?!’ answers dating questions,” The New York Post’’, October 12, 2011.</ref>

Flicker starred in the reality television series Why Am I Still Single?!, which premiered on VH1 on October 16, 2011. Each episode featured two clients, a man and a woman, who were having trouble dating. Flicker sent each client on a test date with one of her recruiters without informing the clients whom they’re dating. She then monitored the date secretly via a remote camera to assess their issues. Afterward she gave each client lessons in an effort to improve their dating habits.

Personal life
In 1997, she married Mark Flicker, with whom she has two children. The couple divorced in 2007. Flicker remarried in 2012, to car salesman Michael Campanella.

Flicker is a resident of Tenafly, New Jersey.

References

External links
Siggy Flicker's official website

1967 births
Living people
20th-century American Jews
American Zionists
American people of Israeli descent
Cherry Hill High School West alumni
Monmouth University alumni
People from Cherry Hill, New Jersey
People from Tenafly, New Jersey
The Real Housewives cast members
21st-century American Jews
American women podcasters
American podcasters